Aadat Se Majboor may refer to:
 Aadat Se Majboor (film), a 1982 Indian Hindi-language film
 Aadat Se Majboor (TV series), a 2017 TV series broadcast on SAB TV
 Aadat Se Majboor, a song from the film Ladies vs Ricky Bahl